Monica Gesue is an American writer and illustrator best known for her work with Theresa Duncan on the 1995 video game Chop Suey.

Illustrated works
Chop Suey (1995)
The Amazing Days of Abby Hayes: Every Cloud Has a Silver Lining (2000)
The Amazing Days of Abby Hayes: The Declaration of Independence (2000)
Astrology Rules!: Every Girl's Dream Guide to Her Stars (2001)
The Amazing Days of Abby Hayes: Have Wheels, Will Travel (2001)
The Amazing Days of Abby Hayes: The Pen Is Mightier than the Sword (2001)
The Amazing Days of Abby Hayes: Look Before You Leap (2001)
The Amazing Days of Abby Hayes: Two Heads Are Better than One (2002)
The Amazing Days of Abby Hayes: Everything Under the Sun (2003)
The Amazing Days of Abby Hayes: Too Close for Comfort (2003)
DIY Girl (2003)
The Amazing Days of Abby Hayes: Good Things Come in Small Packages (2004)
A Good Sport (2013)

References 

Living people
American video game designers
Women video game designers
American children's book illustrators
Year of birth missing (living people)
American women game designers
21st-century American women